Francis Aquirinus Kibira is a Roman Catholic priest, who is the Bishop of Kasese. He was appointed to that position on 15 April 2014.

Early life and priesthood
Kibira was born on 16 April 1958 in the village of Kigoto-Buryansungwe, in Kamwenge District, in the Diocese of Fort Portal, in the Western Region of Uganda. He studied Philosophy at Katigondo Major Seminary in Masaka, from 1977 until 1980. He then studied Theology at St. Mary's National Major Seminary in Ggaba, Kampala, from 1981 until 1984.

He was ordained priest on 23 September 1984	at Fort Portal. He served as priest in the Roman Catholic Diocese of Fort Portal, until 1985. He then served as a lecturer at Katigondo National Major Seminary in Masaka from 1985 until 1987.

In 1987, he left Uganda for Studies of Sacred Scripture at the Pontifical Biblical Institute in Rome, residing at the Pontifical College of St. Paul. He completed his studies in 1991. He returned to Uganda in 1992 and served as Lecturer and Dean of Studies at St. Paul's National Seminary Kinyamasika  Fort Portal. Since 1995, until his appointment as bishop in 2014, he served as the Rector of St. Paul's National Seminary Kinyamasika, in Fort Portal.

As bishop
He was appointed bishop on 15 April 2014. He was consecrated as bishop on 12 July 2014 at  Kasese by Archbishop Paul Kamuza Bakyenga, Archbishop of Mbarara, assisted by Bishop Egidio Nkaijanabwo, Bishop Emeritus of Kasese and Bishop Paul Lokiru Kalanda, Bishop Emeritus of Fort Portal.

See also
 Uganda Martyrs
 Roman Catholicism in Uganda

Succession table

References

External links
Bishop Wants To Meet Museveni Over Rwenzururu Widows, Orphans As of 27 December 2017.
Profile of the Roman Catholic Diocese of Kasese.

1958 births
Living people
20th-century Roman Catholic bishops in Uganda
21st-century Roman Catholic bishops in Uganda
People from Kamwenge District
Roman Catholic bishops of Kasese